Carex drepanorhyncha is a tussock-forming species of perennial sedge in the family Cyperaceae. It is native to parts of China.

See also
List of Carex species

References

drepanorhyncha
Taxa named by Adrien René Franchet
Plants described in 1888
Flora of China